Once Upon a Time in America is the debut studio album by American rapper Smoothe da Hustler. It was released on March 19, 1996 via Profile Records. It was produced entirely by New York City-based producer DR Period with the exception of the song "Glocks On Cock", which was produced by Kenny Gee. It features guest appearances from Trigga tha Gambler, Kovon and DV Alias Khrist.

The album was met with positive reviews, but failed to sell well, only making it to 93 on the Billboard 200, while faring better on the Top R&B/Hip-Hop Albums, peaking at 11. The album produced three singles: "Broken Language" b/w "Hustlin'", "Dollar Bill" b/w "My Brother My Ace" and "Hustler's Theme" b/w "Murdafest". "Broken Language" was alleged to be the inspiration behind Heather Headley's 2002 song "He Is". In a 2006 Vibe interview with Bobbito Garcia, Headley noticed the similarities between the two songs. In a 2006 interview, Smoothe da Hustler confirmed that the song's writer and producer asked him for permission to use the cadence for "Broken Language" and there was a remix of "He Is" with Headley, but the song was never officially released.

Track listing

Sample credits
Track 11 contains samples from "Freddie's Dead" by Curtis Mayfield
Track 15 contains samples from "No One's Gonna Love You" by The S.O.S. Band

Personnel
Damon Smith – main artist
Tawan Smith – featured artist (tracks: 2, 5, 12, 14)
Kenneth "D.V. Alias Khrist" Scranton – featured artist (tracks: 3, 12)
Dawn Tallman – additional vocals (track 7)
Kovon – featured artist (tracks: 10, 11, 15)
Darryl Pittman – producer (tracks: 1-3, 5-15), arranger, mixing, engineering
Kenny Glanton – producer (track 4)
William Broady – executive producer
Randy Battiste – mixing
D. Noize – engineering
Low Mid – engineering
Tony Dawsey – mastering
Hope Carr – sample clearance
Carla Leighton – art direction, design
Daniel Hastings – photography
Will Montanez – stylist

Charts

References

External links

1996 debut albums
Profile Records albums
Hip hop albums by American artists